North Korea is a country in East Asia, in the northern part of the Korean Peninsula. It claims sovereignty over South Korea. Over time North Korea has gradually distanced itself away from the world communist movement. Juche, an ideology of national self-reliance, was introduced into the constitution as a "creative application of Marxism–Leninism" in 1972. The means of production are owned by the state through state-run enterprises and collectivized farms. Most services such as healthcare, 
, housing and food production are subsidized or state-funded. From 1994 to 1998, North Korea suffered from a famine that resulted in the deaths of between 0.24 and 3.5 million people, and the country continues to struggle with food production. North Korea follows Songun, or "military-first" policy. It is the country with the highest number of military and paramilitary personnel, with a total of 9,495,000 active, reserve, and paramilitary personnel. Its active duty army of 1.21 million is the fourth largest in the world, after China, the United States, and India.

Due to the command economy of North Korea, there are relatively few companies in North Korea and they are all managed by the government.

Notable firms 
This list includes notable companies with primary headquarters located in the country. The industry and sector follow the Industry Classification Benchmark taxonomy. Organizations which have ceased operations are included and noted as defunct.

See also 

 Foreign Trade of the DPRK
 Naenara

References

Works cited

External links 
 Economy and foreign trade at Naenara
 
 List of 200 North Korean companies (XLS) at North Korean Economy Watch
 List of North Korean companies (PDF) at Public Intelligence

Korea, North